Agassiz National Wildlife Refuge is located in northwest Minnesota. Packs of wolves, moose, waterfowl, and 294 species of birds make this refuge a wildlife wonderland.

The refuge, originally named Mud Lake Migratory Waterfowl Refuge, was established in 1937 primarily for waterfowl production and maintenance. Located in eastern Marshall County, the contiguous  are situated in the aspen parkland region of northwest Minnesota. In 1976,  of the refuge were designated a Wilderness Area. Each year over 20,000 visitors enjoy wildlife viewing on Agassiz Refuge.

The Wilderness Area encompasses one of the most westerly extensions of black spruce-tamarack bog in Minnesota. Two bog lakes, Kuriko and Whiskey, lie within the area.

References
website

External links

National Wildlife Refuges in Minnesota
Protected areas of Marshall County, Minnesota
Wetlands of Minnesota
Landforms of Marshall County, Minnesota
Protected areas established in 1937
1937 establishments in Minnesota